Lyn is a given name. Notable people with the name include:

 Lyn Allison (born 1946), Australian politician
 Lyn Ashley, Australian actress who worked in the United Kingdom on television during the 1960s
 Lyn Ashton (born 1951), American slalom canoeist
 Lyn Bell (born 1967), Australian freestyle swimmer
 Lyn Brown, British politician
 Lyn Mikel Brown (born 1956), American academic, author and feminist
 Lyn Chevli (1931–2016), American cartoonist 
 Lyn Collingwood, Australian television and film actress
 Lyn Collins (1948–2005), American soul singer
 Lyn Duff (born 1976), American journalist
 Lyn Evans (born 1945), Welsh scientist
 Lyn Gardner, British theatre critic and children's writer 
 Lyn Gunson (born 1953), New Zealand netball player and coach
 Lyn Harding (1867–1952), British actor
 Lyn Hejinian (born 1941), American poet, essayist, translator and publisher
 Lyn Lary (1906–1973), American baseball player
 Lyn James, Welsh actress
 Lyn Jones (born 1964), Welsh rugby union player
 Lyn Marshall (1944–1992), British yoga teacher
 Lyn McLean (1944/1945 – 2017), New Zealand lawn bowler
 Lyn Moran (born 1978), American entertainer
 Lyn Murray (1909–1989), British composer and conductor
 Lyn Parker (born 1952), British civil servant, diplomat, and legal scholar
 Lyn Paul (born 1949), English pop singer and actress
 Lyn St. James (born 1947), American race car driver

Fictional characters
Lyn Scully, from the Australian soap opera Neighbours

See also
Lyn (surname)
Lynn (given name)